Guillermo Nicolás Namor Kong (born 27 November 1996) is a Chilean politician who was elected as a member of the Chilean Constitutional Convention.

References

External links
 
 BCN Profile

Living people
1996 births
21st-century Chilean politicians
Non-Neutral Independents politicians
University of Chile alumni
Members of the Chilean Constitutional Convention
People from Vallenar